Po Shek Wu Estate is a public housing estate located at the junction of Po Shek Wu Road and Choi Yuen Road in Sheung Shui, New Territories, Hong Kong near MTR Sheung Shui station. It comprises three residential blocks of 25, 29 and 33 storeys on a 3-storeyed carpark podium including one semi-basement storey for car park at a total number of 1,144 units completed in 2019. In addition, there is an ancillary facility block including socket-H pile foundation, superstructure and E&M services, one kindergarten, ground floor retail facilities and roof garden site formation and slope upgrading works.

Houses

Politics
Po Shek Wu Estate is located in Shek Wu Hui constituency of the North District Council. It was formerly represented by Lam Cheuk-ting, who was elected in the 2019 elections until March 2021.

See also

Public housing estates in Sheung Shui

References

Sheung Shui
Public housing estates in Hong Kong
Residential buildings completed in 2019